Red Rock is a rock formation in south-central Wyoming that was used by travelers on the Overland Trail to record signature inscriptions from passersby. The sandstone formation records signatures dating to at least the 1850s. The signatures on the upwind side of the rock have weathered to faint traces. The rock is on privately owned land.

Red Rock was listed on the National Register of Historic Places on November 21, 1978.

References

External links
 Red Rock at the Wyoming State Historic Preservation Office

Landforms of Sweetwater County, Wyoming
Overland Trail
Rock formations of Wyoming
Natural features on the National Register of Historic Places in Wyoming
National Register of Historic Places in Sweetwater County, Wyoming